Replay is album by American banjoist Alison Brown, released in 2002.

Reception 

In his Allmusic review, music critic Ronnie D. Lankford, Jr. wrote that of the album; "One may not be able to please all of the fans all of the time, but Replay should please most of Alison Brown's fans most of the time. The Alison Brown Quartet distinguish themselves from competitors by building a solid musical framework and taking flight from there."

Track listing 
All compositions by Alison Brown unless otherwise noted
 "Red Balloon" – 2:59
 "Lorelei" – 3:22
 "Late on Arrival" – 2:18
 "Daytime TV" – 2:58
 "My Favorite Marsha" – 4:14
 "Spiderman Theme" (Perry) – 4:09
 "The Wonderful Sea Voyage" (Brown, West) – 4:18
 "Without Anastasia" – 3:02
 "The Inspector" – 2:24
 "Chicken Road" – 4:31
 "G Bop" (Brown, Burr, Reed, West) – 2:56
 "Étouffée Brutus ?" – 3:48
 "Shoot the Dog" – 3:06
 "Mambo Banjo" – 3:49
 "The Promise of Spring" – 3:23

Personnel
 Alison Brown – banjo, guitar
 John Burr - piano
 Kendrick Freeman - drums
 Garry West - bass

References

2002 albums
Alison Brown albums
Compass Records albums